Sanjavan Marreh (also Romanized as Sanjavān Marreh and Sanjavān Mareh; also known as Sanjavān Mareh Jey) is a village in Jey Rural District, in the Central District of Isfahan County, Isfahan Province, Iran. At the 2006 census, its population was 1,234, in 329 families.

References 

Populated places in Isfahan County